The Sakhalin Coal Mine is a coal mine located in Sakhalin Oblast, Russia. The mine has coal reserves amounting to 2 billion tonnes of coking coal, one of the largest coal reserves in Asia and the world. The mine has an annual production capacity of 3.5 million tonnes of coal.

See also 
 List of mines in Russia

References 

Coal mines in Russia
Sakhalin Oblast
Coal mines in the Soviet Union